My Nephew Emmett is an American live-action short film directed by Kevin Wilson Jr. It was nominated for an Academy Award for Best Live Action Short Film at the 90th Academy Awards in 2018. Wilson won the Student Academy Award for Best Narrative, producing it while a graduate student at New York University.

Plot
The murder of 14-year-old Emmett Till in 1955 Mississippi is experienced from his uncle's perspective.

Cast
 Jasmine Guy as Elizabeth Wright
 Dane Rhodes as J.W. Milam
 L.B. Williams as Mose Wright
 Joshua Wright as Emmett Till

Reception

Critical response
My Nephew Emmett has an approval rating of 91% on review aggregator website Rotten Tomatoes, based on 11 reviews, and an average rating of 8.83/10.

Awards and nominations
At the 90th Annual Academy Awards ceremony in 2018, the film was nominated for the Academy Award for Best Live Action Short Film.

See also
 Civil rights movement in popular culture

References

External links
 
 

2017 films
2017 short films
Drama films based on actual events
Films about racism in the United States
Films set in Mississippi
Civil rights movement in film
2017 drama films
American drama short films
2010s English-language films
2010s American films
Emmett Till in fiction